Xestia kollari is a moth of the family Noctuidae. It is known from the southern Urals to the Amur Region, northern Mongolia, Korea, Japan as well as from China, Ussuri and Kamchatka.

The wingspan is 45–55 mm.

Subspecies
Xestia kollari kollari (southern Urals to the Amur region, northern Mongolia, Korea, Japan)
Xestia kollari plumbata Butler, 1881 (China, Ussuri, Kamchatka)

References

Xestia
Moths of Asia